For the Incomplete is the first studio album by the death metal band Soul Embraced. Tracks 8-11 are featured on The Fleshless EP.

Critical reception
Christian Renner of Metal Crypt writes: "Overall this simply some very well done thrash metal with some death metal influences and if you can look past the slightly annoying snare drum sound you will really like this. Highly Recommended." Josh Spencer from The Phantom Tollbooth writes: "Alrighty then.  It's the voice of God's vengeance, rarely heard anymore.  The other songs aren't quite so bloodthirsty, but uphold the traditionally dark yet evangelical lyrics of Christian metal of the past, ala Vengeance Rising, old Living Sacrifice, Mortification, Believer, etc.  Though most of their predecessors are now fallen, Soul Embraced step up to fill the gap, bringing mighty music of war against the devil, the flesh, and the world."

Track listing

Credits
Soul Embraced
 Chad Moore - Vocals
 Rocky Gray - Lead guitar, bass, backing vocals
 Charlie T. West - Rhythm guitar
 Lance Garvin - Drums

Production
 Dave Quiggle - Artwork
 Nathan Ritter - Recording, mixing, engineer, producer
 Patrick (68) - Mastering

Artwork
 David Southerland - Design
 Redbeard - Other [Tattoos]

References

External links

2001 albums
Soul Embraced albums